The 1933 NFL Championship Game was the first scheduled championship game of the National Football League (NFL) since its founding in 1920. It was played on December 17 at Wrigley Field in Chicago, and the attendance was estimated at 25,000.

The game was between the champions of the league's newly created divisions: the Chicago Bears (10–2–1) of the Western Division and the New York Giants (11–3) of the Eastern Division. Chicago gained the home field due to a better winning percentage in the regular season; after this year the home field alternated, with the Eastern Division champion hosting in even-numbered years and the Western in odd.

Chicago scored the winning touchdown with less than two minutes to go in the fourth quarter, capping a 23–21 victory. It was the Bears' second consecutive championship and third under founder and head coach George Halas.

Background
Before the 1933 season, new Boston Redskins owner George Preston Marshall suggested to the NFL's owners that the league make some rule changes to increase the excitement of the game, including allowing passing from anywhere behind the line of scrimmage, and returning the goal posts to the goal line (which was changed in 1973). Marshall then made another proposal a couple of months later: splitting the ten-team league into two divisions of five teams each, and having the winners of each division play each other in a championship game.

Although the owners were hesitant at first, and some believed that this brash new owner thought their game needed overhauling, the logic of his arguments won out, and they were implemented.

Before the season, the Giants acquired University of Michigan All-American quarterback Harry Newman, and versatile free agent halfback Ken Strong. The Giants finished the regular season 11–3, first in the new "Eastern Division", and Newman, center Mel Hein, and Red Badgro were named first team All-NFL. Newman led the NFL in passes completed (53), passing yards (973), touchdown passes (11), and longest pass completion (78 yards), with his passing yards total setting an NFL record.

The Bears went 10–2–1 and won the NFL's new Western Division, led by running backs Red Grange and Bronko Nagurski, and quarterbacked by Keith Molesworth. Nagurski and Grange combined for 810 yards rushing, and the game was the teams' third meeting of the season, with the Bears winning the teams' first regular-season match-up 14–10, and the Giants their second 3–0.

Attendance for the game was 25,000, and before kickoff Newman informed officials he would be running several new trick plays in the game so they would not be confused when they saw them.

Game summary
The Giants called their first trick play, which was similar to another that was invented much later, early in the first quarter. A shift allowed Mel Hein, the team's center, to be an eligible receiver, but instead of passing the ball to him, after the snap, Newman handed it back to him and, pretending he still had it, dropped back as though he was going to pass. Hein, with the ball hidden under his jersey, ran from the Bears 45-yard line to their 15. Hein may have been able to gain more yards, but when he saw the open field in front of him he sprinted toward the goal line instead of waiting for his blockers like he was supposed to. The Giants were unable to score on this drive, as Chicago's defense tightened and they missed a field goal. Jack Manders kicked a field goal late in the first quarter, and another in the middle of the second quarter to give the Bears a 6–0 lead.

New York responded with a drive in which a 30 yard run ball to Newman who then passed it back to Strong for a touchdown. Strong kicked the extra point making the game 21–16 Giants. Chicago drove to the New York 36-yard line on the ensuing drive, and Nagurski again attempted a jump pass. This time the Giants were ready for the play but were fooled when the receiver, Bill Hewitt, who they were prepared to tackle, lateraled the ball to Karr, who ran 31 yards for the touchdown with under two minutes remaining. Their successful extra point attempt gave them a 23–21 lead.

The Giants drove to their own 40-yard line on the game's final drive, but running back Dale Burnett missed a wide open Hein on another trick play. Burnett threw a wobbly pass to Hein who was standing uncovered on the Bears 30-yard line. On the game's final play Grange tackled Badgro before he could complete the lateral portion of the hook and ladder play New York was attempting. Grange diagnosed the play correctly, and wrapped up Badgro's arms rather than his legs so he could not pitch the ball to Burnett.

The Bears repeated as champions with the victory, and the win marked George Halas' second title as head coach.

Legacy
In a story the following day, the Associated Press described it as "probably the most spectacular game of the year" and "a brilliant display of offensive power".

The First Fifty Years, a 1969 book that chronicles the first half-century of the NFL, listed the 1933 NFL Championship game as the first of "Ten [Games] That Mattered." The National Football League's first championship game was as good as it should have been," says the book. "There are great occasions and great games, but they rarely get together. In 1933, they did...[.] They were two good teams playing on a meterological [sic] accident, a good field in Chicago in December. About 25,000 came out, the largest crowd since Red Grange first came up, and the game they saw was worth the price." The book concludes that "the game had already shown the fast-moving, high-scoring excitement in pro football's future."

Red Grange himself later called the game, "The greatest football game I ever saw or participated in."

In 2019, for the NFL's 100th season, the game was named #51 on the list of the greatest NFL games ever played.

Source:

Officials
Referee: Tommy Hughitt
Umpire: Bobby Cahn
Head Linesman: Dan Tehan
Field Judge: Robert Karch 

Players' shares
The gate receipts for the game were about $21,100. Each player on the winning Bears team received about $210, while Giants players made around $140 each.

Quotes

References 

Gottehrer, Barry. The Giants of New York, the history of professional football's most fabulous dynasty. New York, G. P. Putnam's Sons, 1963  
Pervin, Lawrence A. Football's New York Giants: A History. McFarland 2009 

Chicago Bears postseason
New York Giants postseason
Championship Game
National Football League Championship games
NFL Championship Game
NFL Championship Game
1930s in Chicago